Roberta Kathleen Hunter  is a New Zealand education academic of Cook Islands Māori descent and as of 2019 is a full professor at the Massey University. She specialises in mathematics education.

Academic career

After a 2002 MSc titled  'Constructing decimal concepts in an inquiry classroom'  and  a 2007 PhD titled  'Teachers developing communities of mathematical inquiry '  at the Massey University, Hunter joined the staff, rising to full professor.

In the 2020 Queen's Birthday Honours, Hunter was appointed a Member of the New Zealand Order of Merit, for services to mathematics education.

Selected works 
 Hunter, Roberta, and Glenda Anthony. "Forging mathematical relationships in inquiry-based classrooms with Pasifika students." Journal of Urban Mathematics Education 4, no. 1 (2011): 98–119.
 Hunter, Roberta. "Facilitating communities of mathematical inquiry." Navigating currents and charting directions 1 (2008): 31–39.
 Hunter, Roberta. "Changing roles and identities in the construction of a community of mathematical inquiry." Journal of Mathematics Teacher Education 13, no. 5 (2010): 397–409.

References

Living people
New Zealand educational theorists
New Zealand women mathematicians
Mathematics educators
Year of birth missing (living people)
Cook Island Māori people
Massey University alumni
Academic staff of the Massey University
Members of the New Zealand Order of Merit

21st-century New Zealand mathematicians